Sessler is a German surname. Notable people with the surname include:

Adam Sessler, TV show host
Gerhard M. Sessler (born 1931), German inventor and professor
 Jerrod Sessler, NASCAR driver
Jonathan Sessler (born 1956), chemistry professor

German-language surnames